Chure Rural Municipality is a Gaunpalika in Kailali District in Sudurpashchim Province of Nepal. On 12 March 2017, the government of Nepal implemented a new local administrative structure in which Village Development Committees have been replaced with Municipal and Village Councils. Chure is one of these 753 local units.

References 

Rural municipalities in Kailali District
Rural municipalities of Nepal established in 2017